NFPS can refer to:

Economics 
 Non Financial Public Sector.

Organizations 
 The Vikings (reenactment) a re-enactment society who were formerly known as the Norse Film & Pageant Society

Schools 
 North Fitzroy Primary School A primary school of Melbourne, Australia